The Chesterfield and Kershaw Railroad was a railroad that operated in South Carolina in the late 19th and early 20th century.

History
The company was chartered by South Carolina General Assembly in 1889.

The Chesterfield and Kershaw ran from Cheraw, South Carolina, to Camden, South Carolina.

The line merged with the Seaboard Air Line Railroad in 1901 and became part of their main line.  In 1967, the Seaboard Air Line merged with its rival, the Atlantic Coast Line Railroad.  The merged company was named the Seaboard Coast Line Railroad.
In 1980, the Seaboard Coast Line's parent company merged with the Chessie System, creating the CSX Corporation.  The CSX Corporation initially operated the Chessie and Seaboard Systems separately until 1986, when they were merged into CSX Transportation.  The line is still in service and it is part of CSX's S Line (Hamlet Subdivision).

Historic stations

References

Defunct South Carolina railroads
Railway companies established in 1889
Railway companies disestablished in 1901
Predecessors of the Seaboard Air Line Railroad
1889 establishments in South Carolina
1901 disestablishments in South Carolina